Live is a live album by guitarist Bill Frisell released on the Gramavision label. It was released in 1995 and features a performance by Frisell, bassist Kermit Driscoll and drummer  Joey Baron recorded in 1991 at Terceros Encuentros de Nueva Musica, Teatro Lope de Vega, Seville, Spain.

Reception
The Allmusic review by Rick Anderson awarded the album 4.5 stars, stating, "This album finds Frisell onstage with bassist Kermit Driscoll and drummer Joey Baron, running through a few faves ("Throughout," "Strange Meeting," "When We Go"), as well as some more obscure and surprising material. Driscoll is a sharply intuitive bassist with a reggae player's feel for silence; Baron punctuates more than he undergirds. As a result, this is largely music without groove. Instead, it hovers and floats overhead like a benevolent thunderstorm, sometimes letting loose rumbling, atonal chaos like "Crumb" and sometimes emitting bolts of pure electric light such as the utterly charming "Rag" and the yearning sweetness of "Throughout." "Pip, Squeak/Goodbye" steps briefly into tango territory, and Frisell takes the Sonny Rollins composition "No Moe" all the way back to the Delta with a bent blues solo. The John Hiatt cover, by the way, is the emotional centerpiece of the album: a deeply felt rendition of "Have a Little Faith in Me." This is a very special disc.".

Track listing
All compositions by Bill Frisell except as indicated.
 "Throughout" – 6:42  
 "Rag" – 5:17  
 "Crumb/No Moe" (Frisell/Rollins) –  6:35  
 "Have a Little Faith in Me" (Hiatt) –  5:12  
 "Pip, Squeak/Goodbye" – 8:56  
 "Hello Nellie" – 8:13  
 "Strange Meeting" – 6:45  
 "Hangdog" – 3:25  
 "Child at Heart" – 10:39  
 "Again" – 5:50  
 "When We Go" – 3:50

Personnel
Bill Frisell – guitar
Kermit Driscoll – bass
Joey Baron – drums

References

Bill Frisell live albums
1995 live albums
Gramavision Records live albums